Bubnov or Bubnow is a Russian masculine surname that originates either from a verb bubnit' (to mumble) or from a verb bubenit' (to beat, to ring a bell). its feminine counterpart is Bubnova. The surname may refer to the following notable people:

 Aleksandr Bubnov (born 1955), Soviet and Russian football player, coach, analyst, commentator and businessman
 Andrei Bubnov (1884–1938), Russian Bolshevik revolutionary
 Anton Bubnow (born 1988), Belarusian football player
 Ivan Bubnov (1872–1919), Russian marine engineer
  (1858–1943), Russian medievalist and linguist, whose specialist field was the medieval mathematics of Western Europe
Varvara Bubnova (1886–1983), Russian painter, graphic artist and pedagogue
 Vladimir Bubnov (born 1940), Soviet and Russian football player and coach

See also 
 :ru:Бубнов, a more extensive list in Russian Wikipedia

References

Russian-language surnames